NGC 4440 is a barred spiral galaxy located about 55 million light-years away in the constellation of Virgo. NGC 4440 was discovered by astronomer William Herschel on April 17, 1784. It is a member of the Virgo Cluster.

Physical characteristics
NGC 4440 has a strong bar in its structure. Surrounding the bar, there are two very open spiral arms.

See also 
 List of NGC objects (4001–5000)

References

External links 

Barred spiral galaxies
Virgo (constellation)
4440
40927
7581
Astronomical objects discovered in 1784
Virgo Cluster